Sullivan County is  a county in the Commonwealth of Pennsylvania. It is part of Northeastern Pennsylvania. As of the 2020 census, the population was 5,840, making it the second-least populous county in Pennsylvania. Its county seat is Laporte. The county was created on March 15, 1847, from part of Lycoming County and named for Major General John Sullivan.

History
The land which became Sullivan County was originally purchased from the Iroquois by the Province of Pennsylvania in 1768, as part of the first Treaty of Fort Stanwix. It was then part of Northumberland County, then became part of Lycoming County when it was formed in 1795. Sullivan County itself was formed from the northeastern part of Lycoming County on March 15, 1847. It was the thirteenth and last county formed at least partly from Lycoming County (and the fifth entirely formed from it).

Sullivan County was named for Pennsylvania state senator Charles C. Sullivan, who "took an active part in procuring passage of the bill" establishing the county. However, according to Frederic A. Godcharles (1933), the county is named for General John Sullivan, who led the Sullivan Expedition against the Iroquois in 1779.

Geography

Elevation ranges from 2593 ft at North Mountain in Davidson Township to 779 ft on Loyalsock Creek at the Lycoming County line. The county is served by Pennsylvania Route 42, Pennsylvania Route 87, Pennsylvania Route 154, Pennsylvania Route 487, and U.S. Route 220. The major rivers in the county are Loyalsock Creek, Little Loyalsock Creek, Muncy Creek, and Fishing Creek. The majority of the land in Sullivan County is forest, but there is some farmland, especially in the northern part of the county. There are numerous river valleys in the southern and western parts of  Sullivan County.

Sullivan has a warm-summer humid continental climate (Dfb) and average monthly temperatures in Laporte range from 21.8 °F in January to 67.9 °F in July.

Adjacent counties
Bradford County (north)
Wyoming County (east)
Luzerne County (southeast)
Columbia County (south)
Lycoming County (west)

Geology
Sullivan County lies predominantly within the Appalachian Plateau physiographic province, which is characterized by gently folded and faulted sedimentary rocks of middle to late Paleozoic age. The southern border of the county is approximately at the Allegheny Front, a geological boundary between the Ridge and Valley province and the plateau. (PA Geologic Survey Map 13).  The mountains within the county are part of the Endless Mountains.

The stratigraphic record of sedimentary rocks within the county spans from the Devonian Lock Haven Formation (exposed only in Lick Creek valley) to the coal-bearing Pennsylvanian Allegheny Formation.  Generally, the Catskill Formation underlies most of the lowlands, and sandstones of the Huntley Mountain, Burgoon, Mauch Chunk, or Pottsville Formations cap the mountains.  No igneous or metamorphic rocks exist within the county, other than possible glacial erratics.

Structurally, the bedrock of Sullivan County is gently folded, with the axes of two major anticlines (including the Wilmot Anticline) and two major synclines (Bernice-Mehoopany Syncline and Noxen Syncline) each trending roughly east–west.  There are three mapped faults in the Allegheny Formation between the towns of Murray and Ringdale.

Nearly all of Sullivan County was glaciated several times in the past, during the Pleistocene epoch, or "Ice Age." (PA Geologic Survey Map 59).  Most of the county is covered by glacial till of Late Wisconsinan age.  Late Illinoian Stage deposits may underlie the Late Wisconsinan deposits, and these are exposed in the south central part of the county (roughly western Davidson Township).

The major rivers in Sullivan County are Loyalsock Creek and Muncy Creek.  Both flow into the West Branch of the Susquehanna River.  Some streams along the eastern border of the county flow into the North Branch of the Susquehanna River.  All of Sullivan county is thus within the Chesapeake Bay Watershed.

Several small coal fields exist within Sullivan County. The fields contain either bituminous or semi-anthracite coal, and all occur within Pennsylvanian strata.

Notable geologic features within Sullivan County include some of the following:
 The Haystacks (Huntley Mountain Formation), exposed along Loyalsock Creek south of Dushore, are sandstone mounds of unknown origin
 Ganoga Lake is the state's highest lake at 2265 ft above sea level
 Ricketts Glen State Park, with its many waterfalls
 Worlds End State Park, including an exposure of the Huntley Mountain Formation, and a "rock city" where cross-bedding is visible in the sandstone of the Pottsville Formation
 The Leberfinger Quarry (on Millview Mountain Rd northeast of Forksville), in the Lock Haven Formation where brachiopod fossils, trace fossils, and plant fossils can be observed
 Grand View, located at the southeast corner of the county on a knob of Red Rock Mountain, provides scenic views of the Allegheny Front

 Ticklish Rock, located near Glen Mawr up Rock Run Road, features a rock formation of the Devonian Catskill Formation.

Mountains

Demographics

As of the census of 2000, there were 6,556 people, 2,660 households, and 1,752 families residing in the county.  The population density was 15 people per square mile (6/km2).  There were 6,017 housing units at an average density of 13 per square mile (5/km2).  The racial makeup of the county was 95.58% White, 2.20% Black or African American, 0.76% Native American, 0.15% Asian, 0.46% from other races, and 0.85% from two or more races.  1.10% of the population were Hispanic or Latino of any race. 33.8% were of German, 14.7% Irish, 9.5% English, 7.5% American, 5.9% Polish and 5.6% Italian ancestry.

There were 2,660 households, out of which 24.20% had children under the age of 18 living with them, 54.70% were married couples living together, 6.80% had a female householder with no husband present, and 34.10% were non-families. 29.30% of all households were made up of individuals, and 15.20% had someone living alone who was 65 years of age or older.  The average household size was 2.30 and the average family size was 2.81.

In the county, the population was spread out, with 20.80% under the age of 18, 7.90% from 18 to 24, 24.10% from 25 to 44, 25.30% from 45 to 64, and 21.90% who were 65 years of age or older.  The median age was 43 years. For every 100 females there were 102.10 males.  For every 100 females age 18 and over, there were 100.40 males.

2020 Census

Politics and government

|}

As of August 8, 2022, there are 4,369 registered voters in Sullivan County.

 Republican: 2,659 (60.86%)
 Democratic: 1,222 (27.97%)
 Independent: 322 (7.37%)
 Third Party: 166 (3.80%)

County commissioners
Brian Hoffman, Chair, Republican
Donna Iannone, Vice-chair, Democrat
Darlene Fenton, Republican

Other county offices
District Attorney, Julie Gavitt-Shaffer, Republican
Prothonotary, Register of Wills & Recorder of Deeds, Kellie Carpenter, Democrat
Sheriff, Robert Montgomery, Republican
Treasurer, Katrina Wilkins, Republican
Coroner, Wendy Hastings, Republican

State Representative
Tina Pickett, Republican, 110th district

State Senator
Gene Yaw, Republican, 23rd district

United States House of Representatives
Fred Keller, Republican, Pennsylvania's 12th congressional district

United States Senator
Robert Casey Jr., Democrat
John Fetterman, Democrat

Education

Public school districts
 Sullivan County School District

Sullivan County School District has one high school, grades 7-12, and one elementary school, grades K-6. Sullivan County High School is located in Laporte. Sullivan County Elementary School is located just behind the high school.

Transportation
Public transportation is provided by BeST Transit.

Sullivan County is one of only two counties in Pennsylvania with no known active railroad lines of any kind, the other being Fulton County. However, several narrow-gauge logging railroads once served Sullivan County.

Major roads

Recreation

There are two Pennsylvania state parks in Sullivan County.
Part of Ricketts Glen State Park is in the eastern portion of the county.
Worlds End State Park is near Forksville on Loyalsock Creek.

Sullivan County is also home to a large, private hunting club, Painter Den, Inc. This vast property is situated in Davidson, Laporte and Colley townships. Painter Den Pond is also on the property and is stocked with perch and pike.

Annual events
There are several festivities held in the county each year:
Dushore Dairy Parade, held in mid-June, features cow milking.
Dushore Founder's Day, held in August, features activities such as Outhouse Races, Roll-a-Keg Races, Arts and Crafts, and vendors.
Laporte Fireman's Carnival, held in August, features carnival rides and games.
Sullivan County Fair, held in late August and early September, features carnival rides and games, exhibitions, competitions, a demolition derby, and vendors.

Communities

Under Pennsylvania law, there are four types of incorporated municipalities: cities, boroughs, townships, and, in at most two cases, towns. The following boroughs and townships are located in Sullivan County:

Boroughs
Dushore
Eagles Mere
Forksville
Laporte (county seat)

Townships

Cherry
Colley
Davidson
Elkland
Forks
Fox
Hillsgrove
Laporte
Shrewsbury

Unincorporated communities

Bedford Corners
Beech Glen
Bernice
Bethel
Campbellville
Cherry Mills
Colley
Coveytown
Eagles Mere Park
Eldredsville
Elk Grove (partly in Columbia County)
Elkland Meeting House
Emmons
Estella
Foley Corner
Hemlock Grove
Hillsgrove
Hugos Corner
Kinsley Corners
Lincoln Falls
Long Brook
Lopez
Maple Summit
McCaroll Corner
Mildred
Millview
Muncy Valley
Murray
Nordmont
Ogdonia
Ricketts
Ringdale
Satterfield
Shinerville
Shunk
Sonestown
Summit
Tompkins Corners
Wheelerville
Wissingers

Population ranking
The population ranking of the following table is based on the 2010 census of Sullivan County.

† county seat

See also
National Register of Historic Places listings in Sullivan County, Pennsylvania

References

External links
 Sullivan County Official Website
 Baseline Groundwater Quality from 20 Domestic Wells in Sullivan County, Pennsylvania United States Geological Survey

 
1847 establishments in Pennsylvania
Populated places established in 1847
Counties of Appalachia